Donny Harrel (born December 17, 1969) is an American college baseball coach, currently serving as head coach of the Seattle Redhawks baseball team.  He was named to that position in the summer of 2008 and helped re-launch the program in the 2010 season.

Playing career
Harrel played at Taft College before being drafted in the 18th round of the 1990 MLB Draft by the Kansas City Royals.  He played two seasons in the Royals organization as a first baseman and catcher, reaching Class A.

Coaching career
Harrel began his coaching career as an assistant in the junior college ranks.  After serving at Clackamas, Bakersfield, and Taft, he earned the head coaching position at Lane Community College in Eugene, Oregon.  Over seven seasons with the Titans, Harrel compiled a record of 223–92 and claimed the 1999 NWAACC Championship.  He was named Southern Division Coach of the Year four times and helped build the program with fundraising and facilities improvements during his tenure.  He also coached the Bend Elks collegiate summer team and a Eugene-based American Legion Baseball team.

He then served two seasons as an assistant at Oregon State, serving as a volunteer to facilitate the jump from junior college to major conference Division I competition.  After two seasons working with outfielders and catchers, Harrel became an assistant at Washington.  He served four seasons, working with infielders, hitters and helping with recruiting and several other administrative tasks.  He then moved across town to Seattle to help re-establish the Redhawks baseball program.  Harrel has led the program into the Western Athletic Conference, narrowly missing the conference tournament in 2013.

Head coaching record
This table reflects Harrel's record as a head coach at the Division I level.

See also
List of current NCAA Division I baseball coaches

References

External links

Living people
1969 births
People from North Bend, Oregon
Appleton Foxes players
Bakersfield Renegades baseball coaches
California State University, Bakersfield alumni
Clackamas Cougars baseball coaches
Eugene Emeralds players
Lane Titans baseball coaches
Oregon State Beavers baseball coaches
Seattle Redhawks baseball coaches
Taft Cougars baseball coaches
Taft Cougars baseball players
Washington Huskies baseball coaches